The 2010 WNBA season is the 12th season for the Connecticut Sun franchise of the Women's National Basketball Association. It is their eighth in Connecticut.

Transactions

Dispersal draft
Based on the Sun's 2009 record, they would pick 3rd in the Sacramento Monarchs dispersal draft. The Sun picked DeMya Walker.

WNBA Draft
The following are the Sun's selections in the 2010 WNBA Draft.

Transaction log
January 12: The Sun traded Lindsay Whalen and the second overall pick in the 2010 Draft to the Minnesota Lynx in exchange for Renee Montgomery and the first overall pick in the 2010 Draft.
February 2: The Sun signed free agent Kara Lawson and re-signed Anete Jekabsone-Zogota to multi-year contracts.
February 10: The Sun signed Kerri Gardin to a training camp contract.
February 23: The Sun re-signed Tan White.
April 7: The Sun traded Amber Holt and Chante Black to the Tulsa Shock in exchange for the seventh pick in the 2010 Draft and a second-round pick in the 2011 Draft.
April 8: The Sun announced that Erin Phillips would sit out the season.
April 8: The Sun traded their first-round and a second-round pick in the 2011 Draft to the Minnesota Lynx in exchange for the draft rights to Kelsey Griffin.
April 15: The Sun waived Tamika Whitmore.
April 23: The Sun signed Sha Brooks, Alicia Gladden, May Kotsopoulos, Judie Lomax, Pauline Love and Kaitlin Sowinski to training camp contracts.
April 26: The Sun signed Kailey Klein to a training camp contract.
May 5: The Sun waived Sha Brooks.
May 6: The Sun waived Kaitlin Sowinski, Pauline Love and Kailey Klein.
May 14: The Sun waived May Kotsopoulos and Judie Lomax.

Trades

Free agents

Additions

Subtractions

Roster

Depth

Season standings

Schedule

Preseason

|- align="center" bgcolor="bbffbb"
| 1 || May 4 || 11:00am || Atlanta || 86-79 || Charles (21) || Charles (9) || Montgomery (4) || Mohegan Sun Arena  3,779 || 1-0
|- align="center" bgcolor="bbffbb"
| 2 || May 7 || 7:30pm || Poland National Team || 89-46 || Charles, Kotsopoulos (15) || Charles (9) || Montgomery (5) || Mohegan Sun Arena  5,059 || 2-0
|- align="center" bgcolor="ffbbbb"
| 3 || May 11 || 10:30am || @ New York || 84-89 (3OT) || Charles (22) || Charles, Walker (13) || Lawson, Walker (4) || Madison Square Garden  19,763 || 2-1
|-

Regular season

|- align="center" bgcolor="bbffbb"
| 1 || May 15 || 3:30pm || Chicago || CN100 || 74-61 || Jekabsone-Zogota (18) || Charles, Griffin (10) || Griffin, Lawson (3) || Mohegan Sun Arena  8,072 || 1-0
|- align="center" bgcolor="ffbbbb"
| 2 || May 21 || 7:00pm || @ Atlanta || NBATVCSN-NEFS-S || 82-97 || Charles (22) || Charles (11) || Montgomery (5) || Philips Arena  4,092 || 1-1
|- align="center" bgcolor="bbffbb"
| 3 || May 23 || 3:00pm || Washington ||  || 80-65 || White (15) || Charles (8) || Gardin (4) || Mohegan Sun Arena  7,614 || 2-1
|- align="center" bgcolor="bbffbb"
| 4 || May 27 || 7:30pm || Minnesota ||  || 105-79 || Montgomery (23) || Charles (10) || Lawson, Montgomery (6) || Mohegan Sun Arena  6,401 || 3-1
|- align="center" bgcolor="ffbbbb"
| 5 || May 30 || 4:00pm || @ Washington ||  || 65-69 || Charles (13) || Charles (9) || Montgomery (4) || Verizon Center  8,602 || 3-2
|-

|- align="center" bgcolor="bbffbb"
| 6 || June 4 || 7:30pm || New York ||  || 75-68 || White (18) || Charles (15) || Lawson (6) || Mohegan Sun Arena  6,493 || 4-2
|- align="center" bgcolor="bbffbb"
| 7 || June 6 || 1:00pm || San Antonio ||  || 81-68 || Charles (19) || Charles (11) || Lawson, White (6) || Mohegan Sun Arena  6,292 || 5-2
|- align="center" bgcolor="bbffbb"
| 8 || June 11 || 7:30pm || Indiana || CSN-NE || 86-77 || Montgomery (29) || Charles (12) || Jekabsone-Zogota (5) || Mohegan Sun Arena  7,603 || 6-2
|- align="center" bgcolor="ffbbbb"
| 9 || June 13 || 6:00pm || @ Indiana ||  || 67-77 || Montgomery (17) || Gruda (5) || Jekabsone-Zogota (3) || Conseco Fieldhouse  7,302 || 6-3
|- align="center" bgcolor="bbffbb"
| 10 || June 18 || 10:30pm || @ Los Angeles ||  || 78-75 || Charles (26) || Charles (19) || Jekabsone-Zogota, Jones, White (3) || STAPLES Center  8,852 || 7-3
|- align="center" bgcolor="bbffbb"
| 11 || June 20 || 6:00pm || @ Phoenix || NBATVFS-A || 96-94 || Charles (24) || Charles (12) || Lawson (5) || US Airways Center  6,068 || 8-3
|- align="center" bgcolor="ffbbbb"
| 12 || June 22 || 7:30pm || Chicago || CN100 || 77-86 || Charles (14) || Charles (16) || Montgomery (6) || Mohegan Sun Arena  6,981 || 8-4
|- align="center" bgcolor="bbffbb"
| 13 || June 25 || 7:30pm || Phoenix || CSN-NE || 82-79 || Charles (19) || Charles (23) || Montgomery (6) || Mohegan Sun Arena  9,518 || 9-4
|- align="center" bgcolor="ffbbbb"
| 14 || June 27 || 4:00pm || @ New York || CSN-NE || 68-77 || Lawson, Montgomery (13) || Charles (16) || Montgomery (5) || Madison Square Garden  15,293 || 9-5
|- align="center" bgcolor="bbffbb"
| 15 || June 29 || 8:00pm || @ Tulsa || COX || 101-89 || Gruda, Lawson (17) || Charles (12) || Montgomery (5) || BOK Center  3,649 || 10-5
|-

|- align="center" bgcolor="ffbbbb"
| 16 || July 1 || 8:00pm || @ Chicago || CN100 || 80-92 || Gruda (17) || Gruda (7) || Montgomery (5) || Allstate Arena  3,061 || 10-6
|- align="center" bgcolor="ffbbbb"
| 17 || July 6 || 8:00pm || @ San Antonio || ESPN2 || 66-79 || White (17) || Charles (13) || Lawson (4) || AT&T Center  7,264 || 10-7
|- align="center" bgcolor="ffbbbb"
| 18 || July 7 || 7:00pm || @ Atlanta || SSO || 103-108 (OT) || Charles (27) || Charles (20) || Lawson (8) || Philips Arena  5,305 || 10-8
|- align="center" bgcolor="bbffbb"
| 19 || July 14 || 1:00pm || @ Indiana ||  || 77-68 || Gruda (21) || Griffin (8) || Lawson (5) || Conseco Fieldhouse  10,076 || 11-8
|- align="center" bgcolor="bbffbb"
| 20 || July 17 || 7:00pm || Atlanta ||  || 96-80 || Charles (22) || Charles (14) || White (7) || Mohegan Sun Arena  7,378 || 12-8
|- align="center" bgcolor="ffbbbb"
| 21 || July 20 || 8:00pm || New York || ESPN2 || 74-82 (OT) || Montgomery (23) || Griffin (9) || White (4) || Mohegan Sun Arena  6,478 || 12-9
|- align="center" bgcolor="ffbbbb"
| 22 || July 24 || 7:00pm || Los Angeles || CSN-NE || 80-89 || Montgomery (14) || Charles, Jones (9) || Lawson (4) || Mohegan Sun Arena  8,097 || 12-10
|- align="center" bgcolor="bbffbb"
| 23 || July 27 || 7:30pm || Washington ||  || 88-78 || Jones (23) || Charles (9) || Lawson (7) || Mohegan Sun Arena  6,322 || 13-10
|- align="center" bgcolor="ffbbbb"
| 24 || July 30 || 7:30pm || Atlanta ||  || 62-94 || Jones (16) || Charles (12) || Lawson (5) || Mohegan Sun Arena  7,003 || 13-11
|-

|- align="center" bgcolor="ffbbbb"
| 25 || August 1 || 4:00pm || @ New York || MSG || 67-71 || Jones (18) || Charles (10) || Montgomery (5) || Madison Square Garden  9,341 || 13-12
|- align="center" bgcolor="ffbbbb"
| 26 || August 3 || 8:00pm || @ Minnesota || CSN-NE || 103-111 (OT) || Montgomery (33) || Charles (21) || Charles, Montgomery (4) || Target Center  5,954 || 13-13
|- align="center" bgcolor="ffbbbb"
| 27 || August 5 || 10:30pm || @ Seattle || ESPN2 || 82-83 || Charles (23) || Jones (9) || Montgomery (10) || KeyArena  7,539 || 13-14
|- align="center" bgcolor="bbffbb"
| 28 || August 8 || 5:00pm || Washington ||  || 76-67 || Charles, Jones (17) || Charles (14) || Montgomery (7) || Mohegan Sun Arena  7,076 || 14-14
|- align="center" bgcolor="ffbbbb"
| 29 || August 10 || 7:00pm || @ Washington || NBATVCSN-MA || 74-84 || Montgomery (17) || Charles (15) || Lawson, Montgomery, White (4) || Verizon Center  8,180 || 14-15
|- align="center" bgcolor="bbffbb"
| 30 || August 13 || 7:30pm || Seattle ||  || 88-68 || Jones (19) || Gruda (9) || Charles, Lawson, Montgomery (5) || Mohegan Sun Arena  9,197 || 15-15
|- align="center" bgcolor="ffbbbb"
| 31 || August 15 || 5:00pm || Indiana ||  || 66-79 || Charles (18) || Charles (13) || Montgomery (8) || Mohegan Sun Arena  7,915 || 15-16
|- align="center" bgcolor="bbffbb"
| 32 || August 17 || 7:30pm || Tulsa || CSN-NE || 90-62 || Montgomery (22) || Charles (10) || Charles (4) || Mohegan Sun Arena  8,828 || 16-16
|- align="center" bgcolor="bbffbb"
| 33 || August 20 || 8:30pm || @ Chicago || NBATVCN100 || 78-71 || Montgomery (20) || Griffin (11) || Lawson (6) || Allstate Arena  5,598 || 17-16
|- align="center" bgcolor="ffbbbb"
| 34 || August 22 || 4:00pm || @ New York || MSG || 87-88 (OT) || Charles (21) || Charles (13) || Jones, Montgomery (4) || Madison Square Garden  15,989 || 17-17
|-

| All games are viewable on WNBA LiveAccess

Statistics

Regular season

Awards and honors
Tina Charles was named WNBA Eastern Conference Player of the Week for the week of June 12, 2010.
Tina Charles was named WNBA Rookie of the Month for May.
Tina Charles was named WNBA Rookie of the Month for June.
Tina Charles was named WNBA Rookie of the Month for July.
Tina Charles was named WNBA Rookie of the Month for August.
Tina Charles was named to the 2010 WNBA All-Star Team as a Team USA reserve.
Renee Montgomery was named to the 2010 WNBA All-Star Team as a Team USA reserve.
Tina Charles was named to the All-Rookie Team.
Kelsey Griffin was named to the All-Rookie Team.
Tina Charles was named to the All-WNBA Second Team.

References

External links

Connecticut Sun seasons
Connecticut
Connecticut Sun